Radical Party of Chile may refer to the:

Radical Party (Chile)
Social Democrat Radical Party